The Liverpool International Tennis Tournament (currently known as the Williams BMW Liverpool International Tennis Tournament due to sponsorship and formerly sponsored by Liverpool Hope University, Medicash and Tradition ICAP) is an international four-day tennis exhibition event played annually in June as a grass court warm-up event before Wimbledon. Since 2014 the tournament is held at the Aigburth Cricket Ground in Liverpool, having been previously played in Calderstones Park.

Past finals

Men's Champions

Women's Champions

External links
Official website

Grass court tennis tournaments
Tennis tournaments in England
Exhibition tennis tournaments
Recurring sporting events established in 2002
Sports competitions in Liverpool
2002 establishments in England